Donald Kenneth Nachbaur (born January 30, 1959) is a Canadian professional ice hockey coach and former player. He played eight seasons in the National Hockey League (NHL) with the Hartford Whalers, Edmonton Oilers, Philadelphia Flyers between 1980 and 1990. He would later spend four years in the Austrian Hockey League. After retiring Nachbaur turned to coaching, and spent several years as a head coach in the Western Hockey League (WHL). He was formerly the assistant coach for the Los Angeles Kings of the NHL, and also worked as the head coach of the Spokane Chiefs of the WHL.

Early life
Nachbaur was born on January 30, 1959, in Kitimat, British Columbia, and was raised in Prince George, British Columbia.

Playing career
Nachbaur played his junior career with the Billings Bighorns of the WHL. In two seasons, where he played 162 games (regular-season and Playoffs), he scored 87 goals, added 89 assists for 176 points and accumulated 350 minutes in penalties. Nachbaur still shares the WHL record for most goals in a playoff game where he scored 5 goals on April 20, 1978, at Vancouver, against New Westminster Bruins. Bighorns won 7–4.

Nachbaur played in the NHL with the Hartford Whalers, Edmonton Oilers and Philadelphia Flyers,
and played professionally for 14 years, including parts of eight seasons in the National Hockey League (NHL). In 223 NHL games, he scored 23 goals, added 46 assists and recorded 465 penalty minutes. He was the Whalers' third-round selection (60th overall) in the 1979 NHL Entry Draft.

Nachbaur played 469 games in the American Hockey League (AHL) where he scored 174 goals, added 187 assists for a total of 361 points. He accumulated 1,452 penalty minutes. He won the Calder Cup with the Hershey Bears in the 1987–88 season.

Nachbaur played for ATSE Graz and EC Graz in Austria from 1990 to 1994 where in 182 games he scored 106 goals and added 103 assists for 209 points.

Coaching career
Nachbaur began his coaching career in the 1994–95 season, when he was named head coach of the Seattle Thunderbirds of the Western Hockey League (WHL). He won WHL coach of the year award that season when he led the, to a 42–28–2 record and remained with the Thunderbirds as their head coach until 2000.

Nachbaur then served as an assistant coach for the Philadelphia Phantoms of the American Hockey League (AHL) from 2000 to 2002.

From 2003 to 2009, he served as head coach of the Tri-City Americans of the WHL, earning a .592 winning percentage with 235 wins, 155 losses, 25 overtime losses and 17 shootout defeats over the span of 432 regular season games. His teams made the playoffs in each of his seasons behind the bench, advancing as far as the conference final in 2007–08. On November 29, 2008, Nachbaur became just the tenth WHL coach to win 400 games when the Americans defeated the Vancouver Giants. The Americans won the WHL's U.S. Division regular season title in each of his last two seasons, the first time in franchise history they accomplished the feat. In the 2007–08 season, Nachbaur won his second WHL coach of the year award when he led them to a 52–16–2–2 record and gained a franchise-record 108 points.

For the 2009–10 season, Nachbaur joined the Binghamton Senators of the AHL. After the season he returned to WHL and joined the Spokane Chiefs as their head coach. At the end of the 2016–17 season, and with the Chiefs not making the playoffs for the first time in many years, it was announced that Nachbaur and the Chiefs agreed to mutually part ways.

On June 22, 2017, the Los Angeles Kings announced that Nachbaur was hired as assistant coach.

On June 15, 2020, Nachbaur was announced as the new head coach of SC Bern in the National League (NL), joining the nation's capital on a two-year deal. On December 1, 2020, SC Bern announced that Nachbaur had resigned as head coach of the team.

Career statistics

Regular season and playoffs

References

External links
 

1959 births
Living people
Billings Bighorns players
Canadian expatriate ice hockey players in Austria
Canadian ice hockey centres
Canadian ice hockey coaches
EC Graz players
Edmonton Oilers players
Hartford Whalers draft picks
Hartford Whalers players
Hershey Bears players
Ice hockey people from British Columbia
Los Angeles Kings coaches
Merritt Centennials players
Moncton Alpines (AHL) players
New Haven Nighthawks players
People from Kitimat
Philadelphia Flyers players
Seattle Thunderbirds coaches
Spokane Chiefs coaches
Sportspeople from Prince George, British Columbia
Springfield Indians players
Tri-City Americans coaches